The 1st Canadian Parliament was in session from November 6, 1867, until July 8, 1872.  The membership was set by the 1867 federal election from August 7 to September 20, 1867. It was prorogued prior to the 1872 election.

It was controlled by a majority coalition between the Conservative Party and the Liberal-Conservative Party under Prime Minister Sir John A. Macdonald and the 1st Canadian Ministry.  The Official Opposition was the Liberal Party, led by Edward Blake from 1869 to 1871, followed by a vacancy in the Liberal leadership.

The Speaker was James Cockburn. See also List of Canadian electoral districts (1867–1871) for a list of the ridings in this parliament.

Members of Parliament

Following is a full list of members of the first parliament by province.  Cabinet members are bolded.

Electoral districts denoted by an asterisk (*) indicates that district was represented by two members.

Nova Scotia

Note:

1 – The Anti-Confederate Party dissolved after failing to secure Nova Scotia's secession from Confederation. In 1869 its members joined other parties, or in one case sat as an independent.

New Brunswick

Quebec

Four Quebec members recontested their seats in byelections, and were re-elected:

2 – John Rose was reelected in Huntingdon on November 28, 1867, after being named Minister of Finance.

3 – Barthélemy Pouliot was unseated on petition, but was reelected in L'Islet on July 14, 1869.

4 – Christopher Dunkin was reelected in Brome on November 29, 1869, after being named Minister of Agriculture.

5 – John Henry Pope was reelected in Compton on November 11, 1871, after being named Minister of Agriculture following Dunkin's resignation from Parliament.

Ontario

Note:

6 – One Ontario MP, Alexander Morris, recontested his seat in a byelection. He was reelected in Lanark South on November 29, 1869, after being appointed Minister of Inland Revenue.

Manitoba
Manitoba joined Confederation in 1870. Byelections to choose Manitoba's representatives were held on March 2 and March 3, 1871.

British Columbia
British Columbia joined Confederation in 1871. Byelections to choose the province's representatives were held in November and December of that year.

Pre-Confederation predecessors

By-elections

Works cited

External links
 Seating plan for the House of Commons, 1867
 1867 Orders-in-Council
 1868 Orders-in-Council
 1869 Orders-in-Council
 1870 Orders-in-Council
 1871 Orders-in-Council
 1872 Orders-in-Council
 1873 Orders-in-Council

 
01st Canadian Parliament
1867 in Canada
1868 in Canada
1869 in Canada
1870 in Canada
1871 in Canada
1872 in Canada
1867 establishments in Canada
1872 disestablishments in Canada